Sulk was a Canadian pop/rock/dance music group featuring vocalist Sherrie Lea (Laird) and producer/songwriter Blair O'Halloran.

History
Sulk was formed in 1996 in Toronto, Ontario.  Soon after, the pair independently released a self-titled album.

The group recorded two full-length CDs and one EP.  The group created videos which aired on Much Music and Much More Music.  Sulk's song "Don't Tell Me", which won songwriting awards in Canada.  Sulk's best-known single was the dance track "Only You", which was regularly played in dance clubs internationally in 2001.

After the release of their final CD, Sherrie Lea continued releasing dance tracks for Hi-Bias Records. Later, Sherrie Lea became the vocalist of the rock group Pandamonia.  Producer Blair O'Halloran went on to work with the artist Alissa oh.

Discography

Albums
 Sulk (1996)
 Don't Tell Me (1998)
 Only You (2000)

Singles
 "Don't Tell Me" (1998)
 "Only You" (2000 in Canada/2001 in U.S. and internationally)

References

External links
 hibias.ca
 smpmusicproductions.com
 myspace.com/sulkonlyyou

Musical groups established in 1995
Musical groups disestablished in 2001
Musical groups from Toronto
Canadian pop music groups
1995 establishments in Ontario
2001 disestablishments in Ontario